Hecataeus (Ἑκαταῖος) is a Greek name shared by several historical figures:

 Hecataeus of Miletus (born c. 550 BC), historian
 Hecataeus of the Sindi (r. ca. 390-379), king of the Sindi people
 Hecataeus of Cardia (fl. 323 BC), tyrant of the city of Cardia
 Hecataeus of Abdera (born c. 300 BC), philosopher and historian
 Hecataeus of Eretria (born c. 300 BC), historian
 Hecataeus of Mytilene (born c. 100 BC), sculptor

See also
 Hecataeus (crater), a large lunar impact crater near the eastern limb of the Moon